Ditomopyge is an extinct genus of trilobite belonging to the family Proetidae. It was extant during the Carboniferous and Permian and is widely distributed, with fossils found in Europe, southwest Asia, southeast Asia, Australia, North America, and South America.

Species 
D. amorni Kobayashi and Hamada, 1979
D. bjornensis Ormiston, 1973
D. decurtata Gheyselinck, 1937
D. dereimsi Arellano, 1983
D. fatmii Grant, 1966
D. granulata Weber, 1933
D. kumpani Weber, 1933
D. meridionalis Teichert, 1944
D. ovalis Gauri, 1965
D. scitula Meek and Worthen, 1865
D. whitei Pabian and Faberstrom, 1972
D. yampupatensis Arellano, 1983

References 

Paleozoic life
Proetidae
Trilobites of Europe
Carboniferous trilobites
Permian trilobites